, is a resonant trans-Neptunian object from the Kuiper belt, located in the outermost region of the Solar System. It was first observed on 9 October 1999, by American astronomer Scott Sheppard at the Mauna Kea Observatories with the University of Hawaii 2.2-meter telescope.

Orbit and classification 

 orbits the Sun at a distance of 29.7–48.7 AU once every 245 years and 3 months (89,589 days; semi-major axis of 39.18 AU). Its orbit has an eccentricity of 0.24 and an inclination of 17° with respect to the ecliptic. The body's observation arc begins with a precovery taken at Mauna Kea on 7 October 1999, just two nights prior to its official first observation.

It is a member of the plutinos, a group of resonant trans-Neptunian objects named after Pluto. Located in the inner region of Kuiper belt, the plutinos are making 2 orbits for every 3 Neptune makes.

Numbering and naming 

As of 2018, this minor planet has neither been numbered nor named by the Minor Planet Center. The official discoverer(s) will be defined when the object is numbered.

Physical characteristics 

 has a very reddish color (RR), indicative of a non-carbonaceous composition rich in tholins and methane. According to the Johnston's archive, the object only measures 93 kilometers in diameter based on an absolute magnitude of 8.4, and an assumed albedo of 0.09 for the body's surface. Since it is far too small for being considered a dwarf planet candidate, it is not listed at Michael Brown website. As of 2018, no rotational lightcurve of  has been obtained from photometric observations. The body's rotation period, pole and shape remain unknown.

References

External links 
 1999 TR11, Sheppard, S., Marsden, B. G. 1999, Minor Planet Electronic Circular, 1999-T51
 List of Transneptunian Objects, Minor Planet Center
 
 

Minor planet object articles (unnumbered)

19991009